The Aubertine Building is a historic commercial building located at Cape Vincent in Jefferson County, New York.

Description and history 
It is a three-story, wood-framed structure constructed in 1885 in the Italianate style. It has a two-story ell attached to the west side.

It was listed on the National Register of Historic Places in 1985.

References

Commercial buildings on the National Register of Historic Places in New York (state)
Italianate architecture in New York (state)
Commercial buildings completed in 1885
Buildings and structures in Jefferson County, New York
National Register of Historic Places in Jefferson County, New York